Hourglass Lake is a small meltwater lake midway between Webb Lake and Lake Vashka in Barwick Valley, Victoria Land, Antarctica. The descriptive name was given in 1964 by American geologist Parker E. Calkin and alludes to the outline of the lake.

References

Lakes of Victoria Land
McMurdo Dry Valleys